"Adán y Eva" is a song by Argentine rapper Paulo Londra. Released by Warner Latina and Big Ligas on 5 November 2018, it was written by Londra, Cristian Salazar and Ovy on the Drums, who also produced the song. The song title makes reference to the Abrahamic characters, Adam and Eve. With "Adán y Eva", Londra became the first and only artist to top the Billboard Argentina Hot 100 chart on two occasions, the first time with "Cuando Te Besé" in October, 2018. The song also reached number one in Costa Rica, Ecuador, Peru, Spain and Uruguay.

Charts

Weekly charts

Monthly charts

Year-end charts

Certifications

See also
List of number-one singles of 2018 (Spain)
List of number-one singles of 2019 (Spain)
 List of airplay number-one hits of the 2010s (Argentina)
List of Billboard Argentina Hot 100 number-one singles of 2018
List of Billboard Argentina Hot 100 number-one singles of 2019

References

Cultural depictions of Adam and Eve
2018 singles
2018 songs
Paulo Londra songs
Spanish-language songs
Argentina Hot 100 number-one singles